A diaspora is a population that is scattered across regions which are separate from its geographic place of origin. Historically, the word was used first in reference to the dispersion of Greeks in the Hellenic world, and later Jews after the Babylonian exile. The word "diaspora" is used today in reference to people who identify with a specific geographic location, but currently reside elsewhere.

Examples of notably large diasporic populations are the Assyrian–Chaldean–Syriac diaspora, which originated during and after the early Arab-Muslim conquests and continued to grow in the aftermath of the Assyrian genocide; the southern Chinese and Indians who left their homelands during the 19th and 20th centuries; the Irish diaspora that came into existence both during and after the Great Famine; the Scottish diaspora that developed on a large scale after the Highland Clearances and Lowland Clearances; the nomadic Romani population from the Indian subcontinent; the Italian diaspora and the Mexican diaspora; the Circassians in the aftermath of the Circassian genocide; the Palestinian diaspora due to the Israeli–Palestinian conflict and the broader Arab–Israeli conflict; the Armenian diaspora following the Armenian genocide; the Lebanese diaspora due to the Lebanese Civil War; the Greek population that fled or was displaced following the fall of Constantinople and the later Greek genocide as well as the Istanbul pogroms; and the emigration of Anglo-Saxons (primarily to the Byzantine Empire) after the Norman Conquest of England.

In contemporary times, scholars have differentiated the different kinds of diasporas which currently exist based on the causes of them, such as colonialism, trade/labour migrations, or the kinds of social coherence which exist within the diaspora communities and their ties to the ancestral lands; some diaspora communities maintain strong cultural and political ties to their homelands. Other qualities that may be typical of many diasporas are thoughts of return to the ancestral lands, maintaining any form of ties with the region of origin as well as relationships with other communities in the diaspora, and lack of full integration into the new host countries. Diasporas often maintain ties to the country of their historical affiliation and usually influence their current host country's policies towards their homeland.

According to a 2019 United Nations report, the Indian diaspora is the world's largest diaspora, with a population of 17.5 million, followed by the Mexican diaspora, with a population of 11.8 million, and the Chinese diaspora, with a population of 10.7 million.

Etymology

The term "diaspora" is derived from the Greek verb διασπείρω (diaspeirō), "I scatter", "I spread about" which in turn is composed of διά (dia), "between, through, across" and the verb σπείρω (speirō), "I sow, I scatter". In Ancient Greece the term διασπορά (diaspora) hence meant "scattering" and was inter alia used to refer to citizens of a dominant city-state who emigrated to a conquered land with the purpose of colonization, to assimilate the territory into the empire. An example of a diaspora from classical antiquity is the century-long exile of the Messenians under Spartan rule and the Ageanites as described by Thucydides in his "history of the Peloponnesian wars."

It was first used in this original sense when the Hebrew Bible was translated into Greek; the first mention of a diaspora created as a result of exile is found in the Septuagint, first in
 Deuteronomy 28:25, in the phrase , esē en diaspora en pasais tais basileiais tēs gēs, translated to mean "thou shalt be a dispersion in all kingdoms of the earth"
and secondly in
 Psalms 146(147).2, in the phrase , oikodomōn Ierousalēm ho Kyrios kai tas diasporas tou Israēl episynaxē, translated to mean "The Lord doth build up Jerusalem: he gathereth together the outcasts of Israel".

After the Bible was translated into Greek, the word diaspora was used in reference to the Northern Kingdom which was exiled from Israel by the Assyrians between 740 and 722 BC, as well as Jews, Benjaminites, and Levites who were exiled from the Southern Kingdom by the Babylonians in 587 BC, and Jews who were exiled from Roman Judea by the Roman Empire in 70 AD. It subsequently came to be used in reference to the historical movements and settlement patterns of the dispersed indigenous population of Israel. When it is used in relation to Judaism and when it is capitalized without modifiers (simply, the Diaspora), the term specifically refers to the Jewish diaspora; when it is uncapitalized, the term diaspora may refer to refugee or immigrant populations with other ethnic origins which are living "away from an indigenous or established homeland". The wider application of diaspora evolved from the Assyrian two-way mass deportation policy of conquered populations to deny future territorial claims on their part.

Definition
According to the Oxford English Dictionary Online, the first known recorded usage of the word diaspora in the English language was in 1876 referring "extensive diaspora work (as it is termed) of evangelizing among the National Protestant Churches on the continent". The term became more widely assimilated into English by the mid 1950s, with long-term expatriates in significant numbers from other particular countries or regions also being referred to as a diaspora. An academic field, diaspora studies, has become established relating to this sense of the word. In English, capitalized, and without modifiers (that is simply, the Diaspora), the term refers specifically to the Jewish diaspora in the context of Judaism.

In all cases, the term diaspora carries a sense of displacement. The population so described finds itself for whatever reason separated from its national territory, and usually, its people have a hope, or at least a desire, to return to their homeland at some point if the "homeland" still exists in any meaningful sense. Some writers have noted that diaspora may result in a loss of nostalgia for a single home as people "re-root" in a series of meaningful displacements. In this sense, individuals may have multiple homes throughout their diaspora, with different reasons for maintaining some form of attachment to each. Diasporic cultural development often assumes a different course from that of the population in the original place of settlement. Over time, remotely separated communities tend to vary in culture, traditions, language, and other factors. The last vestiges of cultural affiliation in a diaspora is often found in community resistance to language change and in the maintenance of traditional religious practice.

Scholarly work and expanding definition
William Safran in an article published in 1991, set out six rules to distinguish diasporas from migrant communities. These included criteria that the group maintains a myth or collective memory of their homeland; they regard their ancestral homeland as their true home, to which they will eventually return; being committed to the restoration or maintenance of that homeland, and they relate "personally or vicariously" to the homeland to a point where it shapes their identity. While Safran's definitions were influenced by the idea of the Jewish diaspora, he recognised the expanding use of the term.

Rogers Brubaker (2005) also notes that the use of the term diaspora has been widening. He suggests that one element of this expansion in use "involves the application of the term diaspora to an ever-broadening set of cases: essentially to any and every nameable population category that is to some extent dispersed in space". Brubaker has used the WorldCat database to show that 17 out of the 18 books on diaspora published between 1900 and 1910 were on the Jewish diaspora. The majority of works in the 1960s were also about the Jewish diaspora, but in 2002 only two out of 20 books sampled (out of a total of 253) were about the Jewish case, with a total of eight different diasporas covered.

Brubaker outlines the original use of the term diaspora as follows:

Most early discussions of the diaspora were firmly rooted in a conceptual 'homeland'; they were concerned with a paradigmatic case, or a small number of core cases. The paradigmatic case was, of course, the Jewish diaspora; some dictionary definitions of diaspora, until recently, did not simply illustrate but defined the word with reference to that case.

Brubaker argues that the initial expansion of the use of the phrase extended it to other, similar cases, such as the Armenian and Greek diasporas. More recently, it has been applied to emigrant groups that continue their involvement in their homeland from overseas, such as the category of long-distance nationalists identified by Benedict Anderson. Brubaker notes that (as examples): Albanians, Basques, Hindu Indians, Irish, Japanese, Kashmiri, Koreans, Kurds, Palestinians, and Tamils have been conceptualized as diasporas in this sense. Furthermore, "labor migrants who maintain (to some degree) emotional and social ties with a homeland" have also been described as diasporas.

In further cases of the use of the term, "the reference to the conceptual homeland – to the 'classical' diasporas – has become more attenuated still, to the point of being lost altogether". Here, Brubaker cites "transethnic and transborder linguistic categories...such as Francophone, Anglophone and Lusophone 'communities'", along with Hindu, Sikh, Buddhist, Confucian, Huguenot, Muslim and Catholic 'diasporas'. Brubaker notes that, there were also academic books or articles on the Dixie, white, liberal, gay, queer and digital diasporas.

Some observers have labeled evacuation from New Orleans and the Gulf Coast in the wake of Hurricane Katrina the New Orleans diaspora, since a significant number of evacuees have not been able to return, yet maintain aspirations to do so. Agnieszka Weinar (2010) notes the widening use of the term, arguing that recently, "a growing body of literature succeeded in reformulating the definition, framing diaspora as almost any population on the move and no longer referring to the specific context of their existence". It has even been noted that as charismatic Christianity becomes increasingly globalized, many Christians conceive of themselves as a diaspora, and form an imaginary that mimics salient features of ethnic diasporas.

Professional communities of individuals no longer in their homeland can also be considered diaspora. For example, science diasporas are communities of scientists who conduct their research away from their homeland. In an article published in 1996, Khachig Tölölyan argues that the media have used the term corporate diaspora in a rather arbitrary and inaccurate fashion, for example as applied to “mid-level, mid-career executives who have been forced to find new places at a time of corporate upheaval” (10) The use of corporate diaspora reflects the increasing popularity of the diaspora notion to describe a wide range of phenomena related to contemporary migration, displacement and transnational mobility. While corporate diaspora seems to avoid or contradict connotations of violence, coercion, and unnatural uprooting historically associated with the notion of diaspora, its scholarly use may heuristically describe the ways in which corporations function alongside diasporas. In this way, corporate diaspora might foreground the racial histories of diasporic formations without losing sight of the cultural logic of late capitalism in which corporations orchestrate the transnational circulation of people, images, ideologies and capital.

African diasporas

One of the largest diasporas of modern times is that of Sub-Saharan Africans, which dates back several centuries. During the Atlantic slave trade, 10.7 million people from West Africa survived transportation to arrive in the Americas as slaves. Currently, migrant Africans can only enter thirteen African countries without advanced visas. In pursuing a unified future, the African Union (AU) will allow people to move freely between the 54 countries of the AU under a visa free passport and encourage migrants to return to Africa. 

From the 8th through the 19th centuries, the Arab slave trade dispersed millions of Africans to Asia and the islands of the Indian Ocean. The Islamic slave trade also has resulted in the creation of communities of African descent in India, most notably the Siddi, Makrani and Sri Lanka Kaffirs. 

In the early 500s AD incursions by the kingdom of Aksum in Himyar led to the formation of African diasporic communities.

Asian diasporas
 

The largest Asian diaspora, and in the world, is the Indian diaspora. The overseas Indian community, estimated at over 17.5 million, is spread across many regions in the world, on every continent. It constitutes a diverse, heterogeneous and eclectic global community representing different regions, languages, cultures, and faiths (see Desi). Similarly, the Romani, numbering roughly 12 million in Europe trace their origins to the Indian subcontinent, and their presence in Europe is first attested to in the Middle Ages.

The earliest known Asian diaspora of note is the Jewish diaspora. With roots in the Babylonian Captivity and later migration under Hellenism, the majority of the diaspora can be attributed to the Roman conquest, expulsion, and enslavement of the Jewish population of Judea, whose descendants became the Ashkenazim, Sephardim, and Mizrahim of today, roughly numbering 15 million of which 8 million still live in the diaspora, though the number was much higher before Zionist immigration to what is now Israel and the murder of 6 million Jews in the Holocaust.

Chinese emigration (also known as the Chinese Diaspora; see also Overseas Chinese) first occurred thousands of years ago. The mass emigration that occurred from the 19th century to 1949 was caused mainly by wars and starvation in mainland China, as well as political corruption. Most migrants were illiterate or poorly educated peasants, called by the now-recognized racial slur coolies (Chinese: 苦力, literally "hard labor"), who migrated to developing countries in need of labor, such as the Americas, Australia, South Africa, Southeast Asia, Malaya and other places.

At least three waves of Nepalese diaspora can be identified. The earliest wave dates back to hundreds of years as early marriage and high birthrates propelled Hindu settlement eastward across Nepal, then into Sikkim and Bhutan. A backlash developed in the 1980s as Bhutan's political elites realized that Bhutanese Buddhists were at risk of becoming a minority in their own country. At least 60,000 ethnic Nepalese from Bhutan have been resettled in the United States. A second wave was driven by British recruitment of mercenary soldiers beginning around 1815 and resettlement after retirement in the British Isles and Southeast Asia. The third wave began in the 1970s as land shortages intensified and the pool of educated labor greatly exceeded job openings in Nepal. Job-related emigration created Nepalese enclaves in India, the wealthier countries of the Middle East, Europe, and North America. Current estimates of the number of Nepalese living outside Nepal range well up into the millions.

In Siam, regional power struggles among several kingdoms in the region led to a large diaspora of ethnic Lao between the 1700s–1800s by Siamese rulers to settle large areas of the Siamese kingdom's northeast region, where Lao ethnicity is still a major factor in 2012. During this period, Siam decimated the Lao capital, capturing, torturing, and killing the Lao king Anuwongse, who led the lao rebellion in the 19th century.

European diasporas

European history contains numerous diaspora-like events. In ancient times, the trading and colonising activities of the Greek tribes from the Balkans and Asia Minor spread people of Greek culture, religion and language around the Mediterranean and Black Sea basins, establishing Greek city-states in Magna Graecia (Sicily, southern Italy), northern Libya, eastern Spain, the south of France, and the Black Sea coasts. Greeks founded more than 400 colonies. Tyre and Carthage also colonised the Mediterranean.

Alexander the Great's the conquest of the Achaemenid Empire marked the beginning of the Hellenistic period, characterized by a new wave of Greek colonization in Asia and Africa, with Greek ruling-classes established in Egypt, southwest Asia and northwest India. Subsequent waves of colonization and migration during the Middle Ages added to the older settlements or created new ones, thus replenishing the Greek diaspora and making it one of the most long-standing and widespread in the world. The Romans also established numerous colonies and settlements outside of Rome and throughout the Roman empire.

The Migration-Period relocations, which included several phases, are just one set of many in history. The first phase Migration-Period displacement (between CE 300 and 500) included relocation of the Goths (Ostrogoths and Visigoths), Vandals, Franks, various other Germanic peoples (Burgundians, Lombards, Angles, Saxons, Jutes, Suebi, Alemanni, Varangians and Normans), Alans and numerous Slavic tribes. The second phase, between CE 500 and 900, saw Slavic, Turkic, and other tribes on the move, resettling in Eastern Europe and gradually leaving it predominantly Slavic, and affecting Anatolia and the Caucasus as the first Turkic tribes (Avars, Huns, Khazars, Pechenegs), as well as Bulgars, and possibly Magyars arrived. The last phase of the migrations saw the coming of the Hungarian Magyars. The Viking expansion out of Scandinavia into southern and eastern Europe, Iceland and Greenland. The recent application of the word "diaspora" to the Viking lexicon highlights their cultural profile distinct from their predatory reputation in the regions they settled, especially in the North Atlantic. The more positive connotations associated with the social science term help to view the movement of the Scandinavian peoples in the Viking Age in a new way.

Such colonizing migrations cannot be considered indefinitely as diasporas; over very long periods, eventually, the migrants assimilate into the settled area so completely that it becomes their new mental homeland. Thus the modern Magyars of Hungary do not feel that they belong in the Western Siberia that the Hungarian Magyars left 12 centuries ago; and the English descendants of the Angles, Saxons and Jutes do not yearn to reoccupy the plains of Northwest Germany.

In 1492 a Spanish-financed expedition headed by Christopher Columbus arrived in the Americas, after which European exploration and colonization rapidly expanded. Historian James Axtell estimates that 240,000 people left Europe for the Americas in the 16th century. Emigration continued. In the 19th century alone over 50 million Europeans migrated to North and South America.
Other Europeans moved to Siberia, Africa, and Australasia. The properly Spanish emigrants were mainly from several parts of Spain, but not only the impoverised ones (i.e., Basques in Chile), and the destination varied also along the time. As an example, the Galicians moved first to the American colonies during the XVII-XX (mainly but not only Mexico, Cuba, Argentine and Venezuela, as many writers during the Francoist exile), later to Europe (France, Switzerland) and finally within Spain (to Madrid, Catalonia or the Basque Country).

A specific 19th-century example is the Irish diaspora, beginning in the mid-19th century and brought about by An Gorta Mór or "the Great Hunger" of the Irish Famine. An estimated 45% to 85% of Ireland's population emigrated to areas including Britain, the United States of America, Canada, Argentina, Australia, and New Zealand. The size of the Irish diaspora is demonstrated by the number of people around the world who claim Irish ancestry; some sources put the figure at 80 to 100 million.

From the 1860s the Circassian people, originally from Europe, were dispersed through Anatolia, Australia, the Balkans, the Levant, North America, and West Europe, leaving less than 10% of their population in the homeland – parts of historical Circassia (in the modern-day Russian portion of the Caucasus).

The Scottish Diaspora includes large populations of Highlanders moving to the United States and Canada after the Highland Clearances; as well as the Lowlanders, becoming the Ulster Scots in Ireland and the Scotch-Irish in America.

There were two major Italian diasporas in Italian history. The first diaspora began around 1880, two decades after the Unification of Italy, and ended in the 1920s to the early 1940s with the rise of Fascist Italy. Poverty was the main reason for emigration, specifically the lack of land as mezzadria sharecropping flourished in Italy, especially in the South, and property became subdivided over generations. Especially in Southern Italy, conditions were harsh. Until the 1860s to 1950s, most of Italy was a rural society with many small towns and cities and almost no modern industry in which land management practices, especially in the South and the Northeast, did not easily convince farmers to stay on the land and to work the soil. Another factor was related to the overpopulation of Southern Italy as a result of the improvements in socioeconomic conditions after Unification. That created a demographic boom and forced the new generations to emigrate en masse in the late 19th century and the early 20th century, mostly to the Americas. The new migration of capital created millions of unskilled jobs around the world and was responsible for the simultaneous mass migration of Italians searching for "work and bread". The second diaspora started after the end of World War II and concluded roughly in the 1970s. Between 1880 and 1980, about 15,000,000 Italians left the country permanently. By 1980, it was estimated that about 25,000,000 Italians were residing outside Italy.

Internal diasporas
In the United States of America, approximately 4.3 million people moved outside their home states in 2010, according to IRS tax-exemption data. In a 2011 TEDx presentation, Detroit native Garlin Gilchrist referenced the formation of distinct "Detroit diaspora" communities in Seattle and in Washington, D.C., while layoffs in the auto industry also led to substantial blue-collar migration from Michigan to Wyoming  2005. In response to a statewide exodus of talent, the State of Michigan continues to host "MichAGAIN" career-recruiting events in places throughout the United States with significant Michigan-diaspora populations.

In the People's Republic of China, millions of migrant workers have sought greater opportunity in the country's booming coastal metropolises, though this trend has slowed with the further development of China's interior. Migrant social structures in Chinese megacities are often based on place of origin, such as a shared hometown or province, and recruiters and foremen commonly select entire work-crews from the same village. In two separate June 2011 incidents, Sichuanese migrant workers organized violent protests against alleged police misconduct and migrant-labor abuse near the southern manufacturing hub of Guangzhou.

Much of Siberia's population has its origins in internal migration – voluntary or otherwise – from European Russia since the 16th century.

In Canada, internal migration has occurred for a number of different factors over the course of Canadian history. An example is the migration of workers from Atlantic Canada (particularly Newfoundland and Labrador) to Alberta, driven in part by the cod collapse in the early 1990s and the 1992 moratorium on cod fishing. Fishing had previously been a major driver of the economies of the Atlantic provinces, and this loss of work proved catastrophic for many families. As a result, beginning in the early 1990s and into the late 2000s, thousands of people from the Atlantic provinces were driven out-of-province to find work elsewhere in the country, especially in the Alberta oil sands during the oil boom of the mid-2000s. This systemic export of labour is explored by author Kate Beaton in her 2022 graphic memoir Ducks, which details her experience working in the Athabasca oil sands.

Twentieth century
The twentieth century saw huge population movements. Some involved large-scale transfers of people by government action. Some migrations occurred to avoid conflict and warfare. Other diasporas formed as a consequence of political developments, such as the end of colonialism.

World War II, colonialism and post-colonialism
As World War II (1939–1945) unfolded, Nazi German authorities deported and killed millions of Jews; they also enslaved or murdered millions of other people, including Ukrainians, Russians and other Slavs. Some Jews fled from persecution to unoccupied parts of western Europe or to the Americas before borders closed. Later, other eastern European refugees moved west, away from Soviet expansion and from the Iron Curtain regimes established as World War II ended. Hundreds of thousands of these anti-Soviet political refugees and displaced persons ended up in western Europe, Australia, Canada, and the United States of America.

After World War II, the Soviet Union and Communist-controlled Poland, Czechoslovakia, Hungary and Yugoslavia expelled millions of ethnic Germans, most them descendants of immigrants who had settled in those areas centuries previously. This was allegedly in reaction to German Nazi invasions and to pan-German attempts at annexation. Most of the refugees moved to the West, including western Europe, and with tens of thousands seeking refuge in the United States.

The Istrian–Dalmatian exodus was the post-World War II exodus and departure of local ethnic Italians (Istrian Italians and Dalmatian Italians) as well as ethnic Slovenes, Croats, and Istro-Romanians from the Yugoslav territory of Istria, Kvarner, the Julian March as well as Dalmatia, towards Italy, and in smaller numbers, towards the Americas, Australia and South Africa. These regions were ethnically mixed, with long-established historic Croatian, Italian, and Slovene communities. According to various sources, the exodus is estimated to have amounted to between 230,000 and 350,000 Italians (the others being ethnic Slovenes, Croats, and Istro-Romanians, who chose to maintain Italian citizenship) leaving the areas in the aftermath of the conflict. Hundreds or perhaps tens of thousands of local ethnic Italians (Istrian Italians and Dalmatian Italians) were killed or summarily executed during World War II by Yugoslav Partisans and OZNA during the first years of the exodus, in what became known as the foibe massacres. From 1947, after the war, Istrian Italians and Dalmatian Italians were subject by Yugoslav authorities to less violent forms of intimidation, such as nationalization, expropriation, and discriminatory taxation, which gave them little option other than emigration. In 1953, there were 36,000 declared Italians in Yugoslavia, just about 16% of the original Italian population before World War II. According to the census organized in Croatia in 2001 and that organized in Slovenia in 2002, the Italians who remained in the former Yugoslavia amounted to 21,894 people (2,258 in Slovenia and 19,636 in Croatia).

Spain sent many political activists into exile during the rule of Franco's military regime from 1936 until his death in 1975.

Prior to World War II and the re-establishment of Israel in 1948, a series of anti-Jewish pogroms broke out in the Arab world and caused many to flee, mostly to Palestine/Israel. The 1947–1949 Palestine war likewise saw at least 750,000 Palestinians expelled or forced to flee from the newly forming Israel. Many Palestinians continue to live in refugee camps in the Middle East, while others have resettled in other countries.

The 1947 Partition in the Indian subcontinent resulted in the migration of millions of people between India, Pakistan and present-day Bangladesh. Many were murdered in the religious violence of the period, with estimates of fatalities up to 2 million people. Thousands of former subjects of the British Raj went to the UK from the Indian subcontinent after India and Pakistan became independent in 1947.

From the late 19th century, and formally from 1910, Japan made Korea a Japanese colony. Millions of Chinese fled to western provinces not occupied by Japan (that is, in particular, Sichuan and Yunnan in the Southwest and Shaanxi and Gansu in the Northwest) and to Southeast Asia. More than 100,000 Koreans moved across the Amur River into the Russian Far East (and later into the Soviet Union) away from the Japanese.

The Cold War and the formation of post-colonial states
During and after the Cold War-era, huge populations of refugees migrated from conflict, especially from then-developing countries.

Upheaval in the Middle East and Central Asia, some of which related to power struggles between the United States and the Soviet Union, produced new refugee populations that developed into global diasporas.

In Southeast Asia, many Vietnamese people emigrated to France and later millions to the United States, Australia and Canada after the Cold War-related Vietnam War of 1955–1975. Later, 30,000 French colons from Cambodia were displaced after being expelled by the 1975–1979 Khmer Rouge regime under Pol Pot. A small, predominantly Muslim ethnic group, the Cham people, long residing in Cambodia, were nearly eradicated.
The mass exodus of Vietnamese people from Vietnam from 1975 onwards led to the popularisation of the term "boat people".

In Southwest China, many Tibetan people emigrated to India, following the 14th Dalai Lama after the failure of his 1959 Tibetan uprising. This wave lasted until the 1960s, and another wave followed when Tibet opened up to trade and tourism in the 1980s. It is estimated that about 200,000 Tibetans live now dispersed worldwide, half of them in India, Nepal and Bhutan. In lieu of lost citizenship papers, the Central Tibetan Administration offers Green Book identity documents to Tibetan refugees.

Sri Lankan Tamils have historically migrated to find work, notably during the British colonial period (1796–1948). Since the beginning of the Sri Lankan Civil War in 1983, more than 800,000 Tamils have been displaced within Sri Lanka as a local diaspora, and over a half-million Tamils have emigrated as the Tamil diaspora to destinations such as India, Australia, New Zealand, Canada, the UK, and Europe.

The Afghan diaspora resulted from the 1979 invasion of Afghanistan by the former Soviet Union; both official and unofficial records indicate that the war displaced over 6 million people, resulting in the creation of the second-largest refugee population worldwide  (2.6 million in 2018).

Many Iranians fled the 1979 Iranian Revolution which culminated in the fall of the USA/British-ensconced Shah.

In Africa, a new series of diasporas formed following the end of colonial rule. In some cases, as countries became independent, numerous minority descendants of Europeans emigrated; others stayed in the lands which had been family homes for generations. Uganda expelled 80,000 South Asians in 1972 and took over their businesses and properties. The 1990–1994 Rwandan Civil War between rival social/ethnic groups (Hutu and Tutsi) turned deadly and produced a mass efflux of refugees.

In Latin America, following the 1959 Cuban Revolution and the introduction of communism, over a million people have left Cuba.

A new Jamaican diaspora formed around the start of the 21st century. More than 1 million Dominicans live abroad, a majority living in the US.

A million Colombian refugees have left Colombia since 1965 to escape that country's violence and civil wars.

In South America, thousands of Argentine and Uruguay refugees fled to Europe during periods of military rule in the 1970s and 1980s.

In Central America, Nicaraguans, Salvadorans, Guatemalans, and Hondurans have fled conflict and poor economic conditions.

Hundreds of thousands of people fled from the Rwandan genocide in 1994 and moved into neighboring countries.

Between 4 and 6 million have emigrated from Zimbabwe beginning in the 1990s especially since 2000, greatly increasing the Zimbabwean diaspora due to a protracted socioeconomic crisis, forming large communities in South Africa, the United Kingdom, Australia, Canada, and smaller communities in the United States, New Zealand and Ireland, where their skills have been in high demand. The long war in Congo, in which numerous nations have been involved, has also spawned millions of refugees.

A South Korean diaspora movement during the 1990s caused the homeland fertility rate to drop when a large amount of the middle class emigrated, as the rest of the population continued to age. To counteract the change in these demographics, the South Korean government initiated a diaspora-engagement policy in 1997.

Twenty-first century

Middle Eastern conflicts

Following the Iraq War, nearly 3 million Iraqis had been displaced as of 2011, with 1.3 million within Iraq and 1.6 million in neighboring countries, mainly Jordan and Syria. The Syrian Civil War has forced further migration, with at least 4 million displaced as per UN estimates.

Venezuelan refugee crisis

Following the presidency of Hugo Chávez and the establishment of his Bolivarian Revolution, over 1.6 million Venezuelans emigrated from Venezuela in what has been called the Bolivarian diaspora. The analysis of a study by the Central University of Venezuela titled Venezuelan Community Abroad. A New Method of Exile by El Universal states that the Bolivarian diaspora in Venezuela has been caused by the "deterioration of both the economy and the social fabric, rampant crime, uncertainty and lack of hope for a change in leadership in the near future".

Diaspora Internet services
There are numerous web-based news portals and forum sites dedicated to specific diaspora communities, often organized on the basis of an origin characteristic and a current location characteristic. The location-based networking features of mobile applications such as China's WeChat have also created de facto online diaspora communities when used outside of their home markets. Now, large companies from the emerging countries are looking at leveraging diaspora communities to enter the more mature market.

In popular culture
Gran Torino, a 2008 drama starring Clint Eastwood, was the first mainstream American film to feature the Hmong American diaspora.

See also

 List of diasporas
 List of sovereign states and dependent territories by immigrant population
 Expulsion of Poles by Nazi Germany
 Partition of India
 Armenian genocide
 Diaspora politics 
 Ethnic cleansing
 Kurdish refugees
 The Exodus
 Expulsions and exoduses of Jews
 Forced displacement
 Human migration
 Long Walk of the Navajo
 Population transfer
 Rural exodus
 State collapse
 Stateless nation
 Trail of Tears
 Ummah
 Yom HaAliyah
 Rohingya genocide
 Expulsion of the Moriscos

References

Citations

Sources 

 Barclay, John M. G. (ed.), Negotiating Diaspora: Jewish Strategies in the Roman Empire, Continuum International Publishing Group, 2004
 Baser, B and Swain, A. Diasporas as Peacemakers: Third Party Mediation in Homeland Conflicts with Ashok Swain. International Journal on World Peace 25, 3, September 2008.
 Braziel, Jana Evans. 2008. Diaspora – an introduction. Malden, MA: Blackwell.
 
 Bueltmann, Tanja, et al. eds. Locating the English Diaspora, 1500–2010 (Liverpool University Press, 2012)
 
 Délano Alonso, Alexandra and Harris Mylonas. 2019. “The Microfoundations of Diaspora Politics: Unpacking the State and Disaggregating the Diaspora,” Journal of Ethnic and Migration Studies, Volume 45, Issue 4: 473-491.
 Forbes, Andrew, and Henley, David, People of Palestine (Chiang Mai: Cognoscenti Books, 2012), 
 Galil, Gershon, & Weinfeld, Moshe, Studies in Historical Geography and Biblical Historiography: Presented to Zekharyah Ḳalai, Brill, 2000
 Jayasuriya, S. and Pankhurst, R. eds. (2003) The African Diaspora in the Indian Ocean. Trenton: Africa World Press
 Kantor, Mattis, The Jewish timeline encyclopedia: a year-by-year history from Creation to the Present, (New updated edition), Jason Aronson, Northvale NJ, 1992
 Kenny, Kevin, Diaspora: A Very Short Introduction. New York: Oxford University Press, 2013.
 Luciuk, Lubomyr, "Searching for Place: Ukrainian Displaced Persons, Canada and the Migration of Memory," University of Toronto Press, 2000.
 Mahroum, Sami & De Guchteneire, P. (2007), Transnational Knowledge Through Diaspora Networks-Editorial. International Journal of Multicultural Societies 8 (1), 1–3
 Mahroum, Sami; Eldridge, Cynthia; Daar, Abdallah S. (2006). Transnational diaspora options: How developing countries could benefit from their emigrant populations. International Journal on Multicultural Societies, 2006.
 Nesterovych, Volodymyr (2013). "Impact of ethnic diasporas on the adoption of normative legal acts in the United States". Viche. 8: 19–23.
 Oonk, G, Global Indian Diasporas: trajectories of migration and theory, Amsterdam University Press, 2007 Free download here
 Shain, Yossi, Kinship and Diasporas in International Politics, Michigan University Press, 2007
 Tetlow, Elisabeth Meier, Women, Crime, and Punishment in Ancient Law and Society, Continuum International Publishing Group, 2005
 Weheliye, Alexander G. "My Volk to Come: Peoplehood in Recent Diaspora Discourse and Afro-German Popular Music." Black Europe and the African Diaspora. Ed. Darlene Clark. Hine, Trica Danielle. Keaton, and Stephen Small. Urbana: U of Illinois, 2009. 161–79. Print.
 
 Xharra, B. & Wählisch, M. Beyond Remittances: Public Diplomacy and Kosovo's Diaspora, Foreign Policy Club, Pristina (2012), abstract and free access here.

Further reading
 Gewecke, Frauke. "Diaspora" (2012). University Bielefeld – Center for InterAmerican Studies.

External links

 Livius.org: Diaspora
 Open access book on Diasporas
 Integration: Building Inclusive Societies (IBIS) UN Alliance of Civilizations online community on Good Practices of Integration of Migrants across the World
 Diasporic Trajectories: Transnational Cultures in the 21st Century Podcast playlist of a seminar series held in 2015 at the University of Edinburgh, School of Literatures, Languages, and Cultures

 
Diaspora studies